Clinton Arlando Fowler (January 30, 1898 – September 22, 1972) was an American lawyer and politician who served as a member of the Virginia House of Delegates during the General Assembly's 1932 and special 1933 sessions. A resident of Ringgold, he represented the district composed of Pittsylvania and the City of Danville.

References

External links 
 
 

1898 births
1972 deaths
Democratic Party members of the Virginia House of Delegates
20th-century American politicians